Nothing But Pleasure is the third short subject American comedian Buster Keaton made for Columbia Pictures. Keaton made a total of ten films for the studio between 1939 and 1941.

Plot summary
Clarence Plunkett (Buster) and his wife (Dorothy Appleby) drive to Detroit to buy a new car. To save money on the shipping fee, they decide to drive it back home.

Production
This short was later remade as an episode of The Abbott and Costello Show.

External links

Nothing But Pleasure at the International Buster Keaton Society

1940 films
1940 comedy films
Columbia Pictures short films
American black-and-white films
Films directed by Jules White
American comedy short films
1940s English-language films
1940s American films